LTI – Lingua Tertii Imperii: Notizbuch eines Philologen (1947) is a book by Victor Klemperer, Professor of Literature at the Dresden University of Technology. The title, half in Latin and half in German, translates to "The Language of the Third Reich: A Philologist's Notebook"; the book is published in English translation as The Language of the Third Reich.

Content
Lingua Tertii Imperii studies the way that Nazi propaganda altered the German language to inculcate people with the ideas of Nazism. The book was written in the form of personal notes which Klemperer wrote in his diary, especially from the rise of the Nazi regime in 1933, and even more after 1935, when Klemperer was stripped of his academic title because he was of Jewish descent. His diary became a notebook in which he noted and commented on the linguistic relativity of the German used by Nazi officials, ordinary citizens, and even fellow Jews. Klemperer wrote the book, based on his notes, in 1945–1946.

LTI demonstrates changes in the German language in most of the population. In contrast, the text also emphasizes the idea that resistance to oppression begins by questioning the constant use of buzzwords. Both the book and its author unexpectedly survived the war. LTI was first published in 1947 in Germany.

It underlines odd constructions of words intended to give a "scientific" or neutral aspect to otherwise heavily engaged discourses, as well as significant every-day behaviour.

Examples 
Klemperer notes that much of the Nazi language involved appropriating old words and adapting their meaning, rather than making new ones. Among the examples he recorded of propagandistic language use were the following.

Recurrent words 
 Artfremd ("Alien to the species")
 Ewig ("Eternal") E.gr.: der ewige Jude (the eternal Jew); das ewige Deutschland (the eternal Germany)
 fanatisch, Fanatismus (Fanatical / Fanaticism; used in a particularly Orwellian way: strongly positively connoted for the "good" side, and strongly negatively connoted for the "bad" side)
Instinkt  (instinct)
spontan (spontaneous)

Euphemisms (Schleierwörter) 
 Evakuierung ("evacuation"): deportation
 Holen ("pick up"): arrest
 Konzentrationslager ("concentration camp"): extermination camp
 Krise ("crisis"): defeat
 Sonderbehandlung ("special treatment"): murder
 Verschärfte Vernehmung ("intensified interrogation"): torture

Recurrent expressions and motives 
 the war "imposed" onto a peace-loving Führer. (France and the United Kingdom did declare war on Germany, but only after Germany remilitarized the Rhineland, annexed Austria, annexed Czechoslovakia and  invaded Poland.)
 the "incommensurable hate" of the Jews  – an example of Orwellian ambiguity: the Jews have an "incommensurable hate" of the Third Reich (aggressive or conspiratorial), but the German people have an "incommensurable hate" of the Jews (spontaneous and legitimate).
 Examples taken from Victor Klemperer's diaries:
 January 1, 1935 – language tertii imperii:  Lutze's New Year message to the  SA...Our "fanatical will" twice in a non-pejorative sense. Emphasis on believing without understanding. (1) "fanatical engagement of the SA," (2) "fanatical sense of commitment."
 November 24, 1936 – On the language of the Third Reich:...The Fuhrer must be followed blindly, blindly! They do not need to explain anything at all, since they are accountable to no one. Today it occurred to me: Never has the tension between human power and powerlessness, human knowledge and human stupidity been so overwhelmingly great as now.
 February 19, 1938 - ...the basic principle of the whole language of the Third Reich  became apparent to me: a bad conscience; its triad: defending oneself, praising oneself, accusing - never a moment of calm testimony.
 May 23, 1938 – The aim of education in the Third Reich and of the language of the Third Reich, is to expand the popular stratum in everyone to such an extent that the thinking stratum is suffocated.
 August 29, 1939 – Lingua...there is no longer any talk of  Bolshevists, but instead of the Russian people.
 December 31, 1940 – language tertii imperii: In  Hitler's New Year Order of the Day to the troops again the "victories of unparalleled dimensions," again the American superlative, "The year of 1941 will see the accomplishment of the greatest victory in our history."

Prefixes 
 Groß- ("Great")
 Volk(s)- ("Volk = people, Volks = of or for the people (prefix)"). Volksgemeinschaft designated the racially pure community of nations. Volkswagen is an example of a term which has outlived the Third Reich.
 Welt- ("world", as in Weltanschauung, "intuition/view of the world"): this was quite a rare, specific and cultured term before the Third Reich, but became an everyday word. It came to designate the instinctive understanding of complex geo-political problems by the Nazis, which allowed them to openly begin invasions, twist facts or violate human rights, in the name of a higher ideal and in accordance to their theory of the world.

Neologisms 
 arisieren ("to aryanise")
 aufnorden ("to nordicise up", make more Nordic).
 entjuden ("to de-Jew"). Conversely, after the war, a strong trend of Entnazifizierung ("denazification") took place.
 Untermenschentum ("sub-humanity", from Untermensch)

In film 
Language Does Not Lie (La langue ne ment pas), a 2003 documentary film based on Klemperer's book, directed by Stan Neumann

See also 
 Big Lie
 Doublespeak
 Glossary of Nazi Germany
 Joseph Goebbels
 Groupthink
 Newspeak
 Philology
 Völkischer Beobachter

References

Sources

External links 

 Nazi Language and Terminology at United States Holocaust Memorial Museum
 Index to the LTI (German)
 Selections from LTI by David Greenbaum

 
Nazi propaganda
Sociolinguistics
Books about discourse analysis
Books about propaganda
1947 non-fiction books